Robbie Brennan (born 1947, Dublin, Ireland - died 12 April 2016, Nenagh County Tipperary) was an Irish drummer and a former member of Phil Lynott's band Grand Slam. Brennan also played with a variety of Irish musicians such as Christy Moore, Skid Row, Auto Da Fé, Paul Brady and Clannad.

For several years in the late 1970s and early 1980s, Brennan was the drummer of the Dublin rock band Stepaside, named after the Dublin suburb of the same name, along with ex-Miami Showband member Paul Ashford.

He was also a member of Scullion recording Spin in 1985. Brennan played with Auto Da Fé, then later with Dublin jazz band Hotfoot during the 1980s until it disbanded in 1987.

Death
Brennan died in Nenagh on 12 April 2016 after a long illness.

References

Sources

External links
 Robbie Brennan credits, Artistdirect.com

2016 deaths
Irish drummers
Male drummers
1947 births
Musicians from Dublin (city)
Place of death missing
People educated at C.B.C. Monkstown